Pi Mensae b (π Men b, π Mensae b), also known as HD 39091 b, is an extrasolar planet approximately 59 light-years away in the constellation of Mensa.  The planet was announced orbiting the yellow main-sequence star Pi Mensae in October 2001.

Detection and discovery 

On October 15, 2001, a team of astronomers including Jones, Butler, Tinney, Marcy, Penny, McCarthy, Carter, and Pourbaix announced the discovery of one of the most massive extrasolar planets that have yet been observed. It was discovered by the Anglo-Australian Planet Search team, using a Doppler spectrometer mounted on the Anglo-Australian Telescope.

Physical characteristics 

Pi Mensae b has a very eccentric orbit and takes 5.72 years to revolve around the star. The semi-major axis of the planet's orbit around the star is 3.31 AU. This planet passes through the star's habitable zone at periastron (1.19 AU) while at apastron, it passes to around Jupiter-Sun distance (5.44 AU). The gravitational influence of this planet would disrupt the orbit of any potentially Earth-like planet.

Pi Mensae b is over ten times more massive than Jupiter, the most massive planet in the Solar System. It will have 10 times the surface gravity of Jupiter alone and could be incandescent (glowing).

In 2020, the true mass of Pi Mensae b was measured to be  via astrometry. Since this is greater than 13 Jupiter masses, the object could be considered a brown dwarf.

The plane of orbit of Pi Mensae b is strongly inclined to equatorial plane of the star, with the misalignment equal to 24±4.1°.

See also 

 30 Arietis Bb
 Gliese 777 b
 HD 70642 b

References

External links 
 
 
 

Brown dwarfs
Mensa (constellation)
Giant planets
Exoplanets discovered in 2001
Exoplanets detected by radial velocity
Exoplanets detected by astrometry